Randy Darling (born August 2, 1957, in Langdon, North Dakota) is an American curler.

At the international level, he is a  curler.

At the national level, he is a 1979 United States junior champion curler.

Teams

References

External links

Living people
1957 births
People from Cavalier County, North Dakota
Sportspeople from North Dakota
American male curlers